Lowell Cunningham (born c. 1958/1959) is an American comic book author. He is best known for creating the comic book The Men in Black, which later became the basis for a media franchise.

Early life
Lowell Cunningham was raised in Franklin, Tennessee, the son of farmers Ralph and Ruby Cunningham, the latter of whom was also an office worker for the state government. A fan of science-fiction and espionage fiction spy-fiction TV shows in his youth, he went on to a bachelor's degree in philosophy from The University of Tennessee in 1985.

Career
Following college, Cunningham worked for nearly three years in the circulation department of the Knox County Library in Knoxville, Tennessee. After his 1990 comic-book series The Men in Black from Aircel Comics finished its run, Cunningham worked as a factory security guard. When his comic became the basis for the 1997 film Men in Black, Cunningham earned what he said in an interview that year was an initial "six-figure sum. In the low six figures. I've been living off it for five years."

This launched a media franchise that has included the sequels Men in Black II (2002) and Men in Black 3 (2012), a 2019 spin-off Men in Black: International, and an animated television program, Men in Black: The Series, which ran from October 1997 to June 2001. Cunningham went on to co-write four Star Wars parody short films with director John E. Hudgens, released from 2000 to 2005, and in 2012 returned to comics with About Comics' Jack Ooze, starring a district attorney turned semi-liquid superhero.

Personal life
As of 2008, Cunningham lived in West Knoxville, Tennessee.

Bibliography

Comics
Comics work includes:
The Men in Black (with Sandy Carruthers, three-issue miniseries, Aircel Comics, January–March 1990, trade paperback, June 1990)
Alien Nation: The Skin Trade (with Leonard Kirk, four-issue miniseries, Malibu Comics, March–June 1991)
The Men in Black Book II (with Sandy Carruthers & Scott Dutton, three-issue miniseries, Aircel Comics, May–July 1991)
Alien Nation: The Public Enemy (with Sandy Carruthers, three-issue miniseries, Malibu Comics, Dec. 1991 - March 1992)
Men In Black: Far Cry (with Dietrich Smith, one-shot, Marvel Comics, Aug. 1997)
Men in Black: Movie Adaptation (with Rod Whigham, one-shot, Marvel Comics, Oct. 1997)
Men In Black: Retribution (with Rod Whigham, one-shot, Marvel Comics, Dec. 1997)
Jack Ooze (About Comics, 2012)

Short films
Star Wars parodies with John Hudgens include:
Crazy Watto (2000)
Darth Vader's Psychic Hotline (April 2002)
The Jedi Hunter (August 2002)
Sith Apprentice (March 2005)

References

External links

American comics writers
American science fiction writers
Living people
Year of birth missing (living people)